Taavi Aulis Rytkönen (5 January 1929 – 16 April 2014) was a Finnish footballer. He became the country's first professional player when he signed for France's Toulouse FC in 1952.

In total Rytkönen spent eight seasons (1952–1960) in France, winning the French Cup in 1957. A forward, he started his career in Finland with KuPS Kuopio in 1945, and after returning from France he worked as player-coach of HJK Helsinki 1960–1966 and as coach 1967–1971.

Rytkönen earned 37 caps for the Finnish national team, scoring seven goals. He played for Finland at the 1952 Summer Olympics in Helsinki. He also worked as national coach from 1975 to 1978. He was chosen Finland's Player of the Year in 1949, 1950, and 1952.

References

1929 births
2014 deaths
People from Karttula
Association football forwards
Expatriate footballers in France
Finnish expatriate footballers
Finnish football managers
Finnish footballers
Finland international footballers
Finland national football team managers
Footballers at the 1952 Summer Olympics
Helsingin Jalkapalloklubi managers
Helsingin Jalkapalloklubi players
Kuopion Palloseura players
Ligue 1 players
Ligue 2 players
Olympic footballers of Finland
Toulouse FC players
Sportspeople from North Savo